Federal B. Area is a residential area in Karachi, Sindh, Pakistan. The population of the Union Councils is on the higher side because this is a developed area, thickly populated and further division beyond the Census Circle is not possible. Therefore, main roads were taken as boundaries of the Union Councils, which restricted the leverage available to create Union Councils of 50,000 population.

History
After the independence of Pakistan in 1947, thousands of federal government employees had migrated to Pakistan and faced housing crisis. In 1953, Prime Minister  Muhammad Ali Bogra had initiated the housing scheme for government employees and it was named as Mansura but the name 'Federal B. Area' for the same housing scheme became much more popular among the people of Karachi.

There are several ethnic groups in Federal B Area including Muhajirs, Memons, Bohras and Ismailis.

When Pakistan came into being the port city of Karachi was chosen as the capital of the federation. An area within Karachi was selected to serve as the home of federal government offices and employees and house other important buildings. This area was named as Federal Capital Area or F.C. Area. The residential area around F.C. Area came to be known by the people as Federal B Area or F.B. Area. Block 14 has a notable Ansari House near Falah Mosque and Talimi Bagh which is famous in Dastagir.

The area surrounding the FC and FB Area was designated as Buffer Zone, all residential construction was barred in the buffer zone to keep the main population of the city of Karachi at bay from the sensitive FC Area. However, when the capital of Pakistan was moved from Karachi to Islamabad, the Federal Capital Areas name changed to Federal B Area as it is known in 2012.

There are 22 distinct blocks in Federal Area. A number of blocks of the area are better known by other names. 
This includes 
Block 1 & 2 as Sharifabad,
Block 3 as Hussainabad
Block 4, 5 & 6 as Tayyababad, Block 7, 8 as Azizabad,
Block 9 & 10 as Dastagir,
Block 11 & 12 as Sharifabad,
Block 14, 15 & 16 as Naseerabad, Block 17 18 as Samnabad,
Block 19 as Al-Noor Society,
Block 20 as Incholi,
Block 21 & 22 as Industrial Area.

Shahrah-e-Pakistan 
Another aspect of Federal-B-Area's geography is that Shahrah-i-Pakistan runs through it. This main artery of the city roughly bisects Federal-B-Area into two zones. The importance of Shahrah-i-Pakistan cannot be overlooked. It is the same road which runs from Karachi Port to all the way to Landi Kotal in NWFP.
The Famous Flat namely Yousuf Plaza build by Al Azam Builders located at Shahrah-e-Pakistan, around 1200 apartments, having approx 10,000 residents. in the jurisdiction of UC-29. 
The social entrepreneur Asad Hussain is performing a vital role for the society s welfare, with the liaison of civil society.    
The renowned Sana s Mental Health Solutions, SMHs a clinic of Clinical Psychology running under the supervision of professional lady Madam Sana Asad 
( Member of the British Psychology Society) is also situated @ Yousuf Plaza FB Area Block 16.
The biggest hospital MAMJI Hospital, Federal Hospital & M.I Hospital are also located on the  main road. 
The biggest supper marts - branches of BIN HASHIM & CHASE are also playing the vital roles.

Neighbourhoods 
This council councillor name is Mudassir Hussain.
 Samanabad
 Ayesha Manzil
 Incholi 
 Al-Noor 
 Azizabad 
 Karimabad
 Hussainabad 
 Shafiq Mill Colony
 Naseerabad
 Water Pump
 Yaseenabad
 Dastagir
 Nomanabad Mansoora Block-16

See also
 Federal Capital Territory
 Gulberg Town
 Dastagir
 Dastagir Colony
 Talimi Bagh
 Azizabad
 Aisha Manzil

References

Neighbourhoods of Karachi